Olimpia Carlisi (born 29 December 1946) is an Italian stage, film and television actress.

Career 
Carlisi was born in Campi Bisenzio, Florence, on 29 December 1946. After her debut as a stage actress, she made her film debut working with Roberto Rossellini in Atti degli apostoli (1968). She focused her career on primarily art films and stage work.

She worked with Jean-Marie Straub and Danièle Huillet in Othon (1970), where her work was praised by critics. American director Mike Nichols cast Carlisi in the role of Luciana in his 1970 film Catch-22.

Continuously active on television, Carlisi was the protagonist in 1970 of the RAI experimental drama Olimpia agli amici, directed by film critic Adriano Aprà.

In 1980, she hosted an infamous edition of the Sanremo Music Festival alongside Roberto Benigni and Claudio Cecchetto.

Awards and recognition 
In 1975, Carlisi won a Globo d'oro for best breakthrough actress.

In 1978, she was nominated for a BAFTA Award for most promising newcomer for her performance in Alain Tanner's The Middle of the World.

References

External links 
 

1946 births
Living people
People from Campi Bisenzio
Italian film actresses
Italian television actresses
Italian stage actresses